Yumil-gwa is a variety of hangwa, a traditional Korean confection. Different varieties of yumil-gwa can be made by combining a wheat flour dough with various ingredients such as: honey, cooking oil, cinnamon powder, nuts, ginger juice, jujube, and cheongju (rice wine).

Etymology 
The word yumil-gwa consists of three syllables: yu meaning "oil", mil meaning "honey", and gwa meaning "confection".

History 
Yumil-gwa varieties have commonly been used and consumed for jesa (ancestral rites).

During the Goryeo era (918–1392), yumil-gwa were offered during national feasts, rites, ceremonies, and banquets, including two Buddhist festivals, the Lotus Lantern Festival and the Festival of the Eight Vows. In 1274, yumil-gwa varieties were used for pyebaek (formal greeting) in the wedding ceremony of King Chungnyeol and Princess Jeguk of Yuan China. In 1296, yumil-gwa was brought to the wedding ceremony of the Crown Prince Won (later King Chungseon) and Princess Gyeguk of Yuan, China.

Excessive use of yumil-gwa has led to the introduction of several regulations throughout history. In 1117, King Sukjong issued a restriction on the extravagant usage of yumil-gwa.  In 1192, it was commanded that yumil-gwa had to be replaced with fruits. In 1353, a total ban was placed on yumil-gwa. During the Joseon era (1392–1897), the use of yumil-gwa was restricted solely for rites, weddings, and toasts to longevity.

Preparation and variations 
Dough for yumil-gwa is made by kneading sifted wheat flour with sesame oil, honey, ginger juice, and cheongju (rice wine). Additional ingredients for filling and garnishing may include cinnamon powder, honey, jujube, and pine nuts. Deep-fried yumil-gwa is soaked in honey or jocheong (rice syrup), and dried.
 Chasu-gwa is a hand-shaped yumil-gwa with five fingers. 
 Jungbaekki, also called junggye, jungbakgye, or junggye-gwa, are rectangular yumil-gwa that are pan-fried before served.
 Mandu-gwa is deep-fried sweet dumplings.
 Maejap-gwa, also called maejak-gwa or tarae-gwa, is a ribbon-shaped yumil-gwa. 
 Yakgwa, also called gwajul, is flower-shaped yumil-gwa made by molding and deep-frying sweet dough.
 Yohwa-gwa is a yumil-gwa made into the shape of water-pepper flower.

References 

 Deep fried foods
 Hangwa